Robert J. Grant (1862 – November 24, 1950) was Director of the United States Mint from 1923 to 1933.

Grant was born in Nova Scotia. Before becoming Director of the U.S. Mint, Grant was the Superintendent of the Denver Mint.  In 1923, President of the United States Calvin Coolidge nominated Grant to be Director of the United States Mint and Grant subsequently held this office from November 1923 to May 1933.  Upon leaving the U.S. Mint, Grant sailed to Shanghai to become mint adviser to the Chinese Nationalist government.

References

1862 births
1950 deaths
Canadian emigrants to the United States
Coolidge administration personnel
directors of the United States Mint
Franklin D. Roosevelt administration personnel
Hoover administration personnel
people from Nova Scotia